Agassiziella dianale is a moth in the family Crambidae. It is found in Sri Lanka.

References

Acentropinae
Moths of Sri Lanka
Moths described in 1893